Arthur Frederick Aaron (born 1885) was a footballer who played in the Football League for Stockport County. He is the first player in alphabetical order in Football League history.

References

1885 births
Footballers from Liverpool
English footballers
Association football forwards
Southport F.C. players
Stockport County F.C. players
St Helens Town A.F.C. players
Accrington Stanley F.C. (1891) players
Ashton Town A.F.C. players
English Football League players
Year of death missing